Wilfred Turner,  (10 October 1921 – 26 June 2015) was a British diplomat in the second half of the Twentieth century.

He was educated at Heywood Grammar School and the University of London. He was with the Ministry of Labour from 1938 to 1942 when he was recruited by C. P. Snow as  a Radar Maintenance Officer. He served in the Second World War as a captain in REME- and was on the staff of the 13th Infantry Brigade from  1945 to 1947 when he went back to the Ministry of Labour. He was Senior Wages Inspector there from 1959 to 1960. He was the Principal at the Hospitals Division at the Ministry of Health from 1960 to 1966, during which time he drafted the report recommending standardisation of hospital  medical records. He also designed and introduced the Yellow Card system for reporting adverse reactions to medicines. He joined the HM Diplomatic Service in  1966. He was Head of Chancery at Kaduna until 1969; then at Kuala Lumpur until 1973; and Deputy High Commissioner at Accra until 1977. He was High Commissioner to Botswana from 1977 to 1981.

References

High Commissioners of the United Kingdom to Botswana
Alumni of the University of London
People educated at Heywood Grammar School
Companions of the Order of St Michael and St George
Commanders of the Royal Victorian Order
Royal Electrical and Mechanical Engineers officers
1921 births
2015 deaths
British expatriates in Nigeria
British expatriates in Malaysia
British expatriates in Ghana